Hagarism: The Making of the Islamic World is a 1977 book about the early history of Islam by the historians Patricia Crone and Michael Cook. Drawing on archaeological evidence and contemporary documents in Arabic,  Armenian, Coptic, Greek, Hebrew, Aramaic, Latin and Syriac, Crone and Cook depict an early Islam very different from the traditionally-accepted version derived from Muslim historical accounts.

According to the authors, "Hagarenes" was a term which near-contemporary sources used to name an Arab movement of the 7th century CE whose conquests and resultant caliphate were inspired by Jewish messianism. Crone and Cook contend that an alliance of Arabs and Jews sought to reclaim the Promised Land from the Byzantine Empire, that the Qur'an consists of 8th-century edits of various Judeo-Christian and other Middle-Eastern sources, and that Muhammad was the herald of Umar "the redeemer", a  Judaic messiah.

Although the hypotheses proposed in Hagarism have been criticized, even by the authors themselves, the book has been hailed as a seminal work in its branch of Islamic historiography. The book questioned prevailing assumptions about traditional sources, proposing new interpretations that opened avenues for research and discussion. It connected the history of early Islam to other areas, from Mediterranean late antiquity to theories of acculturation. Following earlier critical work by  Goldziher,  Schacht, and  Wansbrough, it challenged scholars to use a much wider methodology, including techniques already used in biblical studies. It is thus credited for provoking a major development of the field, even though it might be viewed more as a "what-if" experiment than as a research monograph.

Synopsis
Cook and Crone postulate that "Hagarism" started as a "Jewish messianic movement" to "reestablish Judaism" in the Jewish Holyland (Palestine), that its adherents were first known as muhajirun rather than Muslims, and that their hijra (migration) was to Jerusalem rather than Medina. Its members were initially both Jewish and Arab but the Arabs' increasing success impelled them to break from the Jews around the time of Abd al-Malik ibn Marwan in the late seventh century. They flirted with Christianity, learning a respect for Jesus as prophet and Mary as Virgin, before asserting an independent Abrahamic monotheist identity. This borrowed from the Jewish breakaway sect of Samaritanism "the idea of a scripture limited to the Pentateuch, a prophet like Moses (Muhammad), a holy book revealed like the Torah (the Quran), a sacred city (Mecca) with a nearby mountain (Jabal an-Nour) and shrine (the Kaaba) of an appropriate patriarch (Abraham), plus a caliphate modeled on an Aaronid priesthood."

Methodology
Hagarism begins with the premise that Western historical scholarship on the beginnings of Islam should be based on contemporary historical, archaeological and philological data, as is done for the study of Judaism and Christianity, rather than Islamic traditions and later Arabic writings. The tradition expresses dogma, and tells historically irreconcilable and anachronistic accounts of the community's past. By relying on contemporary historical, archaeological and philological evidence, stressing non-Muslim sources, the authors attempt to reconstruct and present what they argue is a more historically accurate account of Islam's origins.

The term Hagarism
According to the authors, Hagarenes is a term used commonly by various sources (Greek , Syriac  or ) to describe the 7th-century Arab conquerors. The word was a self-designation of the early Muslim community with a double-meaning. Secondly, it refers to Ishmaelites: descendants of Abraham through his handmaid Hagar and their child Ishmael, in the same way as the Jews claimed descent and their ancestral faith from Abraham through his wife Sarah and their child Isaac. Muhammad would have claimed such descent for Arabs to give them a birthright to the Holy Land and to prepend a monotheist genealogy compatible with Judaism to their pagan ancestral practice (such as sacrifice and circumcision). Hagarism thus refers to this early faith movement. The designation as Muslims and Islam would only come later, after the success of conquests made the duty of hijra obsolete.()

Origins
The authors, interpreting 7th century Syriac, Armenian and Hebrew sources, put forward the hypothesis that Muhammad was alive during the conquest of Palestine (about two years longer than traditionally believed; the caliphate of Abu Bakr was hence a later invention). 
He led Jews and Hagarenes (Arabs) united under a faith loosely described as Judeo-Hagarism, as a prophet preaching the coming of a Judaic messiah who would redeem the Promised Land from the Christian Byzantines. This redeemer came in the person of Umar, as suggested by the Aramaic origins of his epithet .

The , the defining idea and religious duty of Hagarenes, thus referred to the emigration from northern Arabia to Palestine (later more generally to conquered territories), not to a single exodus from Mecca to Medina (in particular, "no seventh-century source identifies the Arab era as that of the hijra"). Mecca was only a secondary sanctuary; the initial gathering of Hagarenes and Jews took place rather somewhere in north-west Arabia, north of Medina.

Development
After the successful conquest of the Holy Land, Hagarenes feared that being too influenced by Judaism might result in outright conversion and assimilation.
In order to break with Jewish messianism, they recognised Jesus as messiah (though rejecting his crucifixion), which also served to soften the initially hostile attitude towards a growing numbers of Christian subjects.
However, to form a distinct identity, not conflated with either Judaism or Christianity, ancestral practice was reframed as a distinct monotheistic Abrahamic religion.
It took the Samaritan scriptural position, defined as accepting the Pentateuch while rejecting prophets.
This also served to undermine the legitimacy of the Davidic monarchy, which the Samaritans rejected, as well as the sanctity of Jerusalem.
Instead, Samaritans had had their holy city in Shechem and a temple on the nearby Mount Gerizim; Mecca with its nearby mountain were contrived as a parallel of these.

To combine the Abrahamic, Christian, and Samaritan elements, the role of Muhammad was recast as a prophet parallel to Moses, bringing a new scriptural revelation. The Quran was expeditiously collected from earlier disparate Hagarene writings, possibly heavily edited into its complete form by al-Hajjaj (that is, in the last decade of the 7th century rather than the middle, under Uthman, as traditionally believed; see Origin according to academic historians).

The political theory of early Islam was based on two sources. The first was Samaritan high-priesthood, which joins political and religious authority and legitimises it on basis of religious knowledge and genealogy. Secondly, a resurgence of Judaic influences in Babylonian Iraq, which led to the reassertion of messianism in the form of mahdism, especially in Shia Islam.
The identification as Hagarenes was replaced with the Samaritan notion of Islam (understood as submission or as a covenant of peace), its adherents becoming Muslims.

Consolidation in Iraq
The transition to a confident, recognisably Islamic identity, with its various borrowings assimilated, occurred in the late 7th century, during the reign of Abd al-Malik.
However, its evolution continued.
As power was transferred from Syria to Iraq, Islam incorporated the rabbinical culture of Babylonian Judaism: religious law practised by a learned laity and based on oral traditions.

In the second half of the eighth century, the early Muʿtazila, simultaneously with Karaite Judaism, rejected all oral traditions, leading to a failed attempt to base law on Greek rationalism. In response, scholars followed Shafi'i in gathering chains of authorities (isnads) to support traditions item by item. This original solution finalised the independence of Islam from Judaism.

Part I of the book ends by considering the peculiar state in which the Hagarenes found themselves: their own success pushed them away from the sanctuaries of Jerusalem and Mecca to Babylonia, as finalised by the Abbasid Revolution; Umar had already lived and there was no lost land or freedom to hope for. This led Sunni religious politics into quietism under a desanctified state, contrasted only with "Sufi resignation".

Wider context

The remainder of the book, Parts II and III, discuss later developments and the larger context in which Islam originated: the Late Antique Near East, and relate it to theoretical themes of cultural history.
This contrasts with the usual setting, focusing almost exclusively on Arabian indigenous polytheistic beliefs (jahiliyya).

Reception
The thesis of Hagarism is not widely accepted. Crone and Cook's work was part of revisionist history arising from several scholars associated with the University of London's School of Oriental and African Studies (SOAS), beginning in the 1970s. They introduced methods from biblical studies as a new way of analyzing the history of the Koran and Islam, for instance, the use of contemporary texts in languages other than that used in the holy text, and incorporating evidence from archeology and linguistics.

Hagarism was acknowledged as raising some interesting questions and being a fresh approach in its reconstruction of early Islamic history, but it was described by Josef van Ess as an experiment. He argued that a “refutation is perhaps unnecessary since the authors make no effort to prove it (the hypothesis of the book) in detail ... Where they are only giving a new interpretation of well-known facts, this is not decisive. But where the accepted facts are consciously put upside down, their approach is disastrous."

Jack Tannous, associate professor at Princeton, called the book "brilliantly provocative" in 2011. He commented: 

Stephen Humphreys, professor at UCSB, wrote in his analytic review of the historiography of early Islam: 

David Waines, professor at Lancaster University, states:

The journalist Toby Lester commented in The Atlantic that Hagarism was a notorious work, and that when it was published it "came under immediate attack, from Muslim and non-Muslim scholars alike, for its heavy reliance on hostile sources." He added that, "Crone and Cook have since backed away from some of its most radical propositions—such as, for example, that the Prophet Muhammad lived two years longer than the Muslim tradition claims he did, and that the historicity of his migration to Medina is questionable."

According to Liaquat Ali Khan who claimed to have interviewed Patricia Crone and Michael Cook, both of them would have later suggested that the central thesis of the book was mistaken because the evidence they had to support the thesis was not sufficient or internally consistent enough. Patricia Crone would have suggested to him that the book was “a graduate essay" and "a hypothesis," not "a conclusive finding", but they did nothing to acknowledge it publicly as Khan wrote "that Cook and Crone have made no manifest effort to repudiate their juvenile findings in the book. The authors admitted to me that they had not done it and cater no plans to do so."

Scholarly reviews 
John Wansbrough, who had mentored the authors, reviewed the book, specifically the first part. He begins by praising the book claiming, "the authors' erudition is extraordinary their industry everywhere evident, their prose ebullient." But, he says that "most, if not all, [of the sources] have been or can be challenged on suspicion of inauthenticity" and that "the material is upon occasion misleadingly represented ... My reservations here, and elsewhere in this first part of the book, turn upon what I take to be the authors' methodological assumptions, of which the principal must be that a vocabulary of motives can be freely extrapolated from a discrete collection of literary stereotypes composed by alien and mostly hostile observers, and thereupon employed to describe, even interpret, not merely the overt behaviour but also intellectual and spiritual development of the helpless and mostly innocent actors. Where even the sociologist fears to tread, the historian ought not with impunity be permitted to go."

Robert Bertram Serjeant wrote that Hagarism is "not only bitterly anti-Islamic in tone, but anti-Arabian. Its superficial fancies are so ridiculous that at first one wonders if it is just a 'leg pull', pure 'spoof'."

Eric Manheimer commented that, "The research on Hagarism is thorough, but this reviewer feels that the conclusions drawn lack balance. The weights on the scales tip too easily toward the hypercritical side, tending to distract from what might have been an excellent study in comparative religion."

Oleg Grabar described Hagarism as a "brilliant, fascinating, original, arrogant, highly debatable book" and writes that "the authors' fascination with lapidary formulas led them to cheap statements or to statements which require unusual intellectual gymnastics to comprehend and which become useless, at best cute" and that "... the whole construction proposed by the authors lacks entirely in truly historical foundations" but also praised the authors for trying to "relate the Muslim phenomenon to broad theories of acculturation and historical change." The classicist Norman O. Brown wrote in Apocalypse and/or Metamorphosis (1991) that Hagarism, "illustrates in an ominous way the politics of Orientalism", and citing Grabar's review, added that, "The Western tradition of urbane condescension has degenerated into aggressive, unscrupulous even, calumny".

Michael G. Morony remarked that "Despite a useful bibliography, this is a thin piece of  full of glib generalizations, facile assumptions, and tiresome jargon. More argument than evidence, it suffers all the problems of intellectual history, including reification and logical traps."

Fred M. Donner, reviewing Hagarism in 2006, viewed the book as a "wake-up call": despite initial repudiation, it set a milestone by pointing out that scholars need to "consider a much more varied body of source material than most were used to using, or trained to use." On the other hand, he criticized the book's indiscriminate use of non-Muslim sources and the "labyrinthine" arguments incomprehensible even to many who had strong specialist training.

Follow-up work 
Robert G. Hoyland characterized Hagarism as evolving into a wider inter-disciplinary and literary approach, and said that additional studies would be published in the Studies in Late Antiquity and Early Islam (SLAEI Series) in which his book appears. Since then the "SUNY Series in Near Eastern Studies" has also published a selection of authors who are continuing to produce work related to a modified form of this theory.

See also
Historiography of early Islam
Revisionist school of Islamic studies
Seeing Islam As Others Saw It – a book by Robert G. Hoyland, former student of Patricia Crone, providing an extensive collection of contemporary non-Muslim sources that give accounts of the formative period of Islam.

References

Further reading
 Coster, Marije, "Hagarism", in Muhammad in History, Thought, and Culture: An Encyclopedia of the Prophet of God (2 vols.), Edited by C. Fitzpatrick and A. Walker, Santa Barbara, ABC-CLIO, 2014, Vol I, pp. 236–239.

External links
Full text of Hagarism; The Making Of The Islamic World Crone, Cook

1977 non-fiction books
Books by Michael Cook (historian)
Books by Patricia Crone
Books critical of Islam
English-language books
History books about Islam
Origins of Islam